My Name Is Ylona Garcia is the debut extended play by Filipino-Australian singer, actress and television personality Ylona Garcia. It was released and distributed on August 5, 2016, by Star Music. The EP is a collection of pop love and inspirational songs and it features nine tracks including the lead single "Dahan Dahan Dahan Lang".

Singles
"Dahan Dahan Dahan Lang" is the first single released on 2016. The song peak at number 7 on the Pinoy MYX Countdown Chart and number 10 on the MYX Hit Chart.

"Fly Tonight" was the next single release. The song peak at number 3 on the Pinoy MYX Countdown Chart and peak at number 3 on the MYX Hit Chart. The song also earned Ylona her highest entry on both charts as a soloist.

Promotions
"Dahan Dahan Dahan Lang" was promoted by Ylona Garcia through a performance on WISH 107.5 Radio on July 29, 2016.

"Fly Tonight" was promoted on iWant ASAP on January 5, 2019 followed by an appearance on Philippine morning show Umagang Kay Ganda on January 23, 2019.

Commercial performance
"My Name Is Ylona Garcia" was certified for a gold record award on October 15, 2017 by the Philippine Association of the Record Industry certified award by the presence of its chairperson Atty. Marivic Benedicto, together with Star Music’s Jonathan Manalo and Rox Santos.

Track listing

Release history

References 

2016 debut EPs